CCR4-NOT transcription complex subunit 10 is a protein that in humans is encoded by the CNOT10 gene. It is a subunit of the CCR4-Not deadenylase complex.

References

Further reading